Elevation Pictures is a Canadian film distribution and production company founded in 2013 by Laurie May and co-led by Noah Segal.  The company made its debut at the 2013 Toronto International Film Festival.

Distribution
Since its debut in late 2013, Elevation Pictures has become the leading independent distributor in Canada, releasing both critically acclaimed and commercially successful films. Titles include award-winning films such as The Imitation Game, Moonlight, Room and Flee, and box office hits such as Hustlers and Paw Patrol: The Movie. 

Starting in late 2014, Elevation has had Canadian distribution rights to select films made by Black Bear Pictures, an American independent film company.

In July 2014, Elevation signed a home distribution deal with Universal Pictures Home Entertainment to distribute their titles on Blu-ray and DVD in the majority of Canada, starting with the 2014 film Oculus.

In August 2014, Elevation signed a services deal with Entract Films, which gives Elevation exclusive rights to distribute their films in Quebec.

Production 
In 2016, Elevation launched a production arm spearheaded by Noah Segal in partnership with producer Christina Piovesan. 

Since then, Elevation Pictures Productions has been actively producing and co-producing original film and TV content. Recent projects include French Exit starring Michelle Pfeiffer and Lucas Hedges, The Nest starring Jude Law, and Alice Darling starring Anna Kendrick. 

Elevation has several TV shows currently in development.

Production Titles

Distribution Titles

TV series

References

External links 

 

Canadian companies established in 2013
Film distributors of Canada
Companies based in Toronto
2013 establishments in Ontario
Film production companies of Canada